Several battles and sieges took place around the city of Puebla in Mexico:

 The Siege of Puebla (1847) during the Mexican–American War;
 The Siege of Puebla (1863) during the French intervention in Mexico.